Who I Am is the fifth studio album by American country music artist Alan Jackson. The album was released on June 28, 1994, via Arista Records. It features the Number One singles "Summertime Blues", "Gone Country", "Livin' on Love", and "I Don't Even Know Your Name", and the #6-peaking "Song for the Life".

Several of this album's tracks had been recorded by other artists, including two of the singles: "Summertime Blues" is a cover of the pop standard made famous by Eddie Cochran, while "Song for the Life" was recorded by several artists, including writer Rodney Crowell, whose version can be found on his 1977 debut Ain't Living Long Like This. In addition, "Thank God for the Radio" was a Number One hit in 1984 for The Kendalls from their album Movin' Train. Jackson re-recorded "Let's Get Back to Me and You" for his 2013 release, The Bluegrass Album.

The international version of the album included an extended remix of Jackson's 1993 Number One hit "Chattahoochee" as a bonus track.

Track listing

International tracklist

Note
On the back of the album, "Let's Get Back to Me and You" is listed as track #14, with no #13 on the packaging. A short message on the back reads: "That's right folks, I am just a tad superstitious - AJ."

Personnel
Compiled from the album's liner notes.

Musicians
Alan Jackson – lead vocals, backing vocals on "Summertime Blues"
Eddie Bayers – drums
Stuart Duncan – fiddle
Robbie Flint – acoustic slide guitar
Larry Franklin – fiddle
Paul Franklin – steel guitar
John Hughey – steel guitar
Roy Huskey Jr. – acoustic bass
John Kelton – tic tac bass
Brent Mason – electric guitar, six-string electric bass, acoustic guitar solo on "I Don't Even Know Your Name"
Hargus "Pig" Robbins – piano
John Wesley Ryles – backing vocals
Keith Stegall – acoustic guitar, piano
Bruce Watkins – acoustic guitar
Glenn Worf – bass guitar

Technical
John Kelton – recording, mixing
Steve Lowery – additional recording
Keith Stegall – production
Hank Williams – mastering

Chart performance
Who I Am  peaked  at #5 on the U.S. Billboard 200 and #1 on the Top Country Albums selling 102,000 copies, becoming Alan Jackson's second #1 country album. In January 1999, Who I Am was certified 4× Platinum by the Recording Industry Association of America.

Charts

Weekly charts

Year-end charts

Sales and certifications

References

1994 albums
Alan Jackson albums
Arista Records albums
Albums produced by Keith Stegall